Cayo Levisa is a cay in Pinar del Río Province, Cuba. Accessible only through boats from Palma Rubia, the white sand beaches on its north coast attract tourism. It has several snorkeling and diving sites. It is part of the Colorados Archipelago coral reef and well known for its black coral.

There is a hotel facility on the island made up of roughly 20 cottages.

Geography

The cay is roughly 1.5 km² (150 hectares) in size and 4.2 km long. It is several hundred yards wide in most points, with a maximum width of 750 m and a minimum of 280 m. It is located roughly 150 km west of Havana. Swamps cover more than three quarters of the surface of the island; the south side is inaccessible due to a forest of mangroves.

Climate

The average temperature in Cayo Levisa is between 21°C and 33°C and the water temperature varies between 1°C and 3°C.

See also

 Geography of Cuba
 Geography of North America

References

External links

 Cayo Levisa

Geography of Pinar del Río Province
Islands of Cuba